Pearsall is a city in and the county seat of Frio County, Texas, United States. The population was 9,146 at the 2010 census, up from 7,157 at the 2000 census.

Geography

Pearsall is located near the center of Frio County at  (28.891458, –99.094873). Interstate 35 bypasses the city on the west side, with access from Exits 99, 101, and 104. I-35 leads northeast  to San Antonio and south  to Laredo.

In 2003, Pearsall annexed the unincorporated neighborhood of West Pearsall, increasing the population of the town by about 350 people.

Climate

The climate in this area is characterized by hot, humid summers and generally mild to cool winters.  According to the Köppen climate classification, Pearsall has a humid subtropical climate, Cfa on climate maps.

Demographics

2020 census

As of the 2020 United States census, there were 7,325 people, 2,599 households, and 1,845 families residing in the city.

2000 census
As of the census of 2000, 7,157 people, 2,201 households, and 1,688 families were living in the city. The population density was 1,694.7 people per square mile (654.8/km). The 2,470 housing units averaged 584.9/sq mi (226.0/km). The racial makeup of the city was 73.80% White, 0.39% African American 0.71% Native American, 0.28% Asian, 22.02% from other races, and 2.79% from two or more races. About 84.24% of the population was Hispanic or Latino of any race.

Of the 2,201 households, 41.4% had children under the age of 18 living with them, 53.1% were married couples living together, 18.2% had a female householder with no husband present, and 23.3% were not families. About 20.8% of all households were made up of individuals, and 9.9% had someone living alone who was 65 years of age or older. The average household size was 2.99 and the average family size was 3.47.

In the city, the age distribution was 30.6% under 18, 10.4% from 18 to 24, 26.9% from 25 to 44, 19.7% from 45 to 64, and 12.4% who were 65 or older. The median age was 31 years. For every 100 females, there were 102.6 males. For every 100 females age 18 and over, there were 103.2 males.

The median income for a household in the city was $21,602, and for a family was $23,470. Males had a median income of $21,295 versus $14,720 for females. The per capita income for the city was $13,383. 35.0% of the population and 30.4% of families were below the poverty line. 43.2% of those under the age of 18 and 40.0% of those 65 and older were living below the poverty line.

Government and infrastructure
The United States Postal Service operates the Pearsall Post Office.

The U.S. Immigration and Customs Enforcement operates the South Texas Detention Facility in an unincorporated area in Frio County near Pearsall.

Education

Pearsall Independent School District has four schools: Ted Flores Elementary, Pearsall Intermediate, Pearsall Junior High, and Pearsall High School.

Notable people

 Alfred Allee, a 19th-century peace officer, was at one time a deputy sheriff in Pearsall
 Gene Bailey, baseball player
 Mary Moore, former mayor
 George Strait, country music singer, was born in Poteet, Texas, but raised in Pearsall
 Dave Studdard, professional football player, offensive lineman Denver Broncos (1979–1988)
 Brad Wright, head football coach at Texas State University-San Marcos from 2007 to 2010, was born in Pearsall in 1959

Gallery

References

External links

 City of Pearsall official website
 LoneStar Internet: Pearsall, Texas, very brief history
 Handbook of Texas Online: Pearsall, Texas

Cities in Frio County, Texas
Cities in Texas
County seats in Texas